Clara Anna Korn (1866–1941) was an American pianist, composer and music writer. She was born in Germany, but her family moved to the United States and she grew up in New Jersey. She studied at the National Conservatory of Music in New York City with B.O. Klein, Antonín Dvořák and Horatio Parker.

She taught music in the New Jersey school system and from 1893 to 1898 at the National Conservatory, and served as head of the piano department at the DeBauer School of Music and Languages in New York City. Korn wrote for several music journals and founded the Women's Philharmonic Orchestra.

Works
Korn composed for voice, piano and orchestra. Selected works include:
Capriccio for piano and orchestra
Violin suite
Symphonic poem
Morpheus
Orchestra suite No. 1
Orchestra suite No. 2
Piano Concerto
Piano Sonata
Our Last War opera

References

1866 births
1941 deaths
19th-century classical composers
20th-century classical composers
German classical composers
American music educators
American women music educators
German emigrants to the United States
Musicians from New Jersey
American women classical composers
American classical composers
Pupils of Antonín Dvořák
Pupils of Horatio Parker
20th-century German composers
19th-century American composers
19th-century German composers
20th-century American women musicians
20th-century American composers
20th-century women composers
19th-century women composers
19th-century American women musicians